The 18th arrondissement of Paris (XVIIIe arrondissement) is one of the 20 arrondissements of the capital city of France. In spoken French, this arrondissement is referred to as dix-huitième.

The arrondissement, known as Butte-Montmartre, is located on the right bank of the River Seine. It is mostly known for hosting the district of Montmartre which contains a hill known for its artistic history, the Bateau-Lavoir where Pablo Picasso, Georges Braque, and Amedeo Modigliani lived and worked in early 20th century, the house of music diva Dalida, the Moulin Rouge cabaret, other historic features, and the prominent Sacré Cœur basilica which sits atop the hill.

The 18th arrondissement also contains Goutte d'Or district, which has large numbers of residents of North, and sub-Saharan African origins, and which is famous for its market, the marché Barbès, selling products from Africa.

Geography
The land area of this arrondissement is exactly 6.005 km2 (2.319 sq. miles, or 1,484 acres).

Demographics
The population of Paris's 18th arrondissement peaked in 1931 with 288,810 inhabitants. Today, the arrondissement remains very dense in population and business activity with 200,631 inhabitants as of the most recent census (2009).

Historical population

Immigration
In 2012, John Henley of The Guardian said the 18th arrondissement was "an area comparable in many ways to London's Tower Hamlets."

Cityscape

Places of interest
 Basilique du Sacré-Cœur, Paris
 Basilica of Sainte-Jeanne-d'Arc (Paris)
 Église Saint-Jean-de-Montmartre
 Église Saint-Bernard de la Chapelle
 Moulin Rouge
 Musée d'Art Naïf – Max Fourny
 Montmartre Synagogue

The Serbian Orthodox Eparchy of Western Europe has its headquarters in the arrondissement.

Districts within the 18th arrondissement
 Montmartre
 Pigalle
 Goutte d'Or, a working-class neighborhood in the arrondissement
 Quartier de La Chapelle

Economy
Dailymotion formerly had its headquarters in the arrondissement. In addition, Dargaud also has its headquarters there.

References

External links

 
Montmartre